Marilú Martens is a Peruvian politician. She was Minister of Education of Peru from December 18, 2016, to September 17, 2017.

References

Peruvian women in politics
Living people
Year of birth missing (living people)